Range is an unincorporated community in Conecuh County, Alabama, United States. Range has a post office with ZIP code 36473.

References

Unincorporated communities in Conecuh County, Alabama
Unincorporated communities in Alabama